Cañas y barro is a Spanish limited television series adapting the novel of the same name by Vicente Blasco Ibáñez. It aired in 1978 on TVE1.

Premise 
The fiction is set in El Palmar, a village in La Albufera lagoon, in fin-de-siècle Spain, in between the 19th and 20th centuries. The plot features the strife between fishers (the old) and rice farmers (the new) as backdrop.

Cast 
 José Bódalo as Cañamel.
 Alfredo Mayo as el Tío Paloma.
  as Tono.
  as Tonet.
 Terele Pávez as Samaruca.
  as Neleta.
 Ana Marzoa as Rosa.

Production and release 
Cañas y barro is an adaptation of the 1902 novel of the same name by Vicente Blasco Ibáñez. The novel had been already adapted to a feature film format with the Juan de Orduña's 1954 film . The series was shot in the northern hemisphere Autumn/Winter of 1977 in the same location the fiction takes place, in La Albufera and El Palmar. Adapted to screen by Manuel Mur Oti, the episodes were directed by Rafael Romero Marchent. It consisted of 6 episodes featuring a running time of about 55 minutes. The production had a 70 million peseta budget. It aired on a weekly basis from 26 March 1978 to 30 April 1978. It became the most watched fiction series of the year, and second in general to the documentary series El hombre y la Tierra (non-fiction).

References 
Citations

Bibliography
 
 

Television shows set in the Valencian Community
Television series based on Spanish novels
1978 Spanish television series debuts
1978 Spanish television series endings
La 1 (Spanish TV channel) network series
1970s Spanish drama television series
Television shows filmed in Spain
Television series set in the 19th century
Spanish-language television shows